Abner Pastoll (born 12 February 1982) is a British-South African film director, screenwriter, and editor, born in South Africa, where his family used to own a two-screen cinema.

Background
Abner started making films at the age of 4, inspired primarily by his family's cinema, and his father's film and video equipment. He originally thought he wanted to become an actor, but soon discovered he preferred being behind the camera. He grew up in London.

Career
His directorial work includes A Good Woman Is Hard to Find (2018), Getaway Driver (2017) and Road Games (2015). He is co-founder of production company February Films, which he runs with producer Junyoung Jang (co-producer of Korean film The Host).

In the summer of 2014, he shot the France-UK co-production Road Games  (aka Fausse Route), starring Andrew Simpson, Joséphine de La Baume, Frédéric Pierrot and genre legend Barbara Crampton. The film has been described as a 'taut Euro thriller'. It world premiered in August 2015 at FrightFest in London, and was released theatrically in the US on 4 March 2016 by IFC Films to an overall positive reaction. Bloody Disgusting called it "a wonderful thriller; a layered character-driven narrative with great writing and equally-great tension – a very pleasant surprise." The film currently retains an 83% Fresh position on Rotten Tomatoes.

On 8 March 2017 it was announced on Deadline Hollywood that Abner is to direct the crime-thriller A Good Woman Is Hard to Find from a script by Academy Award nominee and BAFTA winner Ronan Blaney, and starring Sarah Bolger. Filming completed in December 2017.

One of his next known though as yet untitled projects has been described as a "kick-ass, sarcastic" action-thriller set in the Arizona desert.

Filmography

References

External links

British film directors
Living people
1982 births